Pectobacterium atrosepticum is a species of bacterium. It is a plant pathogen causing blackleg of potato. Its type strain is CFBP 1526T (=LMG 2386T =NCPPB 549T =ICMP 1526T). Its genome has been sequenced.

References

Further reading 
 Liu, Hui, et al. "Quorum sensing coordinates brute force and stealth modes of infection in the plant pathogen Pectobacterium atrosepticum." PLoS Pathogens 4.6 (2008): e1000093.

External links 
 LPSN
 Type strain of Pectobacterium atrosepticum at BacDive -  the Bacterial Diversity Metadatabase

Enterobacterales
Bacterial plant pathogens and diseases
Potato diseases
Bacteria described in 2003